Articerodes thailandicus is a rove beetle discovered in Thailand in 2008. It was named for Thailand, where it was first discovered. It is closely related to Articerodes jariyae and Articerodes ohmomoi, discovered during the same study.

References

Insects of Thailand
Clavigeritae